Double C2-like domain-containing protein beta is a protein that in humans is encoded by the DOC2B gene.

Function 

There are at least two protein isoforms of the Double C2 protein,  namely alpha (DOC2A) and beta (DOC2B), which contain two C2-like domains.  DOC2A and DOC2B are encoded by different genes; these genes are at times confused with the unrelated DAB2 gene which was initially named DOC-2. Doc2b enhances Ca(2+)-dependent exocytosis in adipocytes, chromaffin cells of the adrenal gland and beta cells in the pancreas. In the central nervous system, Doc2b contributes to the spontaneous release of neurotransmitters , which was thought to be acting as a high-affinity Ca(2+) sensor for exocytosis of synaptic vesicles  However, further work has shown that while DOC2b is both important for spontaneous exocytosis of synaptic vesicles and binds Calcium, it does not in fact change the calcium dependence of spontaneous synaptic vesicle release and thus can not be the calcium sensor for this process.

References

Further reading